Colias arida  is a butterfly in the family Pieridae found in Tibet and western China.

Taxonomy
Treated as a form of Colias eogene by Röber and described as "paler than eogene, the apex of the forewing being more rounded; among this form there occur as aberrations aurithetne Gr.-Grsh. males with yellow-spotted distal margin, and wanda Gr.-Grsh. light-coloured males." It was accepted as a full species by Grieshuber & Lamas in 2007.

Subspecies
Listed alphabetically:
C. a. arida
C. a. cakana Rose & Schulte, 1992
C. a. muetingi Rose & Schulte, 1992
C. a. wanda Grum-Grshimailo, 1893 - may be a full species as Colias wanda

References

arida
Butterflies described in 1889
Butterflies of Asia